Sølen (also called Rendalssølen, Søln, and Rendalssøln) is a mountain in Rendalen Municipality in Innlandet county, Norway. The lake Sølensjøen lies just east of the mountain. The mountain has three peaks:

The three peaks and their saddles make the mountain distinct and visible from a long distance.

An old pilgrimage route from Sweden via Trysil to Nidaros Cathedral passes through the southern gorge. The Sølen landscape conservation area was established in 2011 and it includes both the mountain massif and parts of the neighboring lake Sølensjøen.

Name
The name is maybe derived from the Old Norse word  which means 'sallow' or 'wan' referring to its color. It could also be derived from the word meaning saddle.

See also
List of mountains of Norway

References

Rendalen
Mountains of Innlandet